Agia Lavra ("Holy Lavra") is a monastery near Kalavryta, Achaea, Greece. It was built in 961 AD, on Chelmos Mountain, at an altitude of 961 meters, and can be described as the symbolic birthplace of modern Greece. It stands as one of the oldest monasteries in the Peloponnese.

It was burnt to the ground in 1585 by the Turks. It was rebuilt in 1600 while the frescoes by Anthimos were completed in 1645. It was burnt again in 1715 and in 1826 by the armies of Ibrahim Pasha of Egypt. In 1850 after the rebirth of modern Greece, the building was completely rebuilt. The monastery was burned down by German forces in 1943.

It is famously linked with the Greek War of Independence, since it was here that the call for Eleftheria I Thanatos (Ελευθερία ή θάνατος) was first heard on 25 March 1821, launching the revolution against the Ottoman Empire. That day, Bishop Germanos of Patras performed a doxology and administered an oath to the Peloponnesian fighters. The revolutionary flag was raised by the Bishop under the plane tree just outside the gate of the monastery.

To this day, the vestments of Germanos, documents, books, icons, the Gospel of Tsarina Catherine II of Russia, sacred vessels, crosses, etc.  are preserved in the Monastery's museum, along with the holy relics of St Alexios, given by Byzantine emperor Manuel II Palaeologus in 1398. Pieces of embroidery, made with gold or silver threads woven in pure silk materials in Smyrna and Constantinople, are also possessions of the Monastery and they date from the 16th century.

On the hill opposite, a monument to the heroes of the Revolution of 1821 looks down upon the monastery.

See also
 Greek War of Independence
 Germanos of Patras
 Greek Flag

Gallery

References

External links
www.waymarking.com

Greek War of Independence
Christian monasteries in Greece
History museums in Greece
Ottoman Greece
960s establishments in the Byzantine Empire
Museums in Peloponnese (region)
Kalavryta
961 establishments
Lavras